Olga Tikhonova (born 23 October 1997) is a Kazakh short track speed skater. She competed at the 2022 Winter Olympics, in Mixed 2000 metre relay.

References

External links
 

1997 births
Living people
Kazakhstani female short track speed skaters
Olympic short track speed skaters of Kazakhstan
Short track speed skaters at the 2022 Winter Olympics
21st-century Kazakhstani women
Asian Games bronze medalists for Kazakhstan
Asian Games medalists in short track speed skating
Medalists at the 2017 Asian Winter Games
Short track speed skaters at the 2017 Asian Winter Games